Lorun (also Romanized as Lorūn; also known as Looroon, Lowrūn, Lūrūn, and Owrūn) is a village in Dowlatabad Rural District, in the Central District of Namin County, Ardabil Province, Iran. At the 2006 census, its population was 127, in 31 families.

References 

Towns and villages in Namin County